Ashley Argota (born January 9, 1993) is an American actress and singer. She is known for her roles on television, such as Lulu on the Nickelodeon sitcom True Jackson, VP, and Kelly on the Nickelodeon sitcom Bucket & Skinner's Epic Adventures.

Early life
Argota was born in Redlands, California to Filipino parents. She graduated in high school from Connections Academy, an online virtual high school. She began her professional career as contestant on the Arsenio Hall-hosted Star Search on CBS in 2003.

Career
Argota's first acting role was an appearance in the 2007 independent film Schooled. In 2008 Argota was cast on the Nickelodeon comedy television series True Jackson, VP, playing the role of Lulu one of the best friends of True Jackson (Keke Palmer). As a singer, Argota has released two independent albums Dreams Come True (2006) and Ashley (2007).

In 2011 Argota was cast as the female lead, Kelly, in another Nickelodeon comedy series Bucket & Skinner's Epic Adventures. Argota confirmed on July 5, 2012 that Nickelodeon had cancelled Bucket & Skinner's Epic Adventures. She also appeared in a Nickelodeon celebrity-episode of the series BrainSurge during which she lost during a Sudden Death round to Jerry Trainor. She appeared again in 2011 with other various Nickelodeon celebrities and won. Argota planned to attend New York University in 2011, majoring in nursing.

Argota was cast in the 2014 Disney Channel Original Movie How to Build a Better Boy in summer 2013, playing the school rival of the film's leads. In December 2013, she starred in the show Aladdin and His Winter Wish at the Pasadena Playhouse playing the Princess. This same month, she was nominated for the Libby Award by Peta2 for her work with adoption practices. Starting in 2014, Argota has played the recurring role of Lou Chan on the ABC Family drama The Fosters, and had a recurring role on the Disney XD series Lab Rats as S-1.

Personal life
In 2021, Argota married actor Mick Torres after having their wedding being delayed due to the COVID-19 pandemic.

Filmography

Discography

Albums

Reissues

Extended Plays

Singles

As a featured artist

Promotional singles

Other appearances

Music videos

References

External links

1993 births
Living people
21st-century American actresses
Actresses from California
American child actresses
American child singers
American film actresses
American television actresses
People from Redlands, California
American actresses of Filipino descent
21st-century American women singers
21st-century American singers